Prince Akbar Mass'oud (or Akbar Mirza Sarem-ed-Dowleh) (1885 – 29 November 1975) was a Persian Prince and a member of Qajar dynasty, son of Mass'oud Mirza Zell-e Soltan and grandson of Nasser al-Din Shah Qajar.

He was styled Mu'in us-Sultaneh before 1909. He was Minister for Works and Commerce 1915, Foreign Affairs 1916, Minister for Finance 1919–1920, Governor of Esfahan 1917, Kermanshah and Hamadan 1920–1921, and Governor-General of Fars 1922–1923 and 1929. Akbar Mirza died at the age of 90 on 29 November 1975 in Esfahan.

He was buried in Takht-e Pulad cemetery.

References
 Soltani, Shahla (2006). Aqajan Shazdeh. Tehran: Farzan Rooz. 

Qajar princes
1885 births
1975 deaths